Nokha Assembly constituency is one of the constituencies of the Rajasthan Legislative Assembly in India.

Nokha Constituency covers all voters from Nokha tehsil excluding  ILRC Kuchor Aathooni.

Members of Legislative Assembly

Election results

2018 Result

References

See also 
 Member of the Legislative Assembly (India)

Bikaner district
Assembly constituencies of Rajasthan